The 2010–11 Superliga season will be the 23rd since its establishment. Rayo Vallecano are the defending champions, having won their 2nd title in the previous season.

First round

Group A

Group B

Group C

Second round

Group A

Group B

Group C

Final

Final standings

See also
 2011 Copa de la Reina

References

 Season on soccerway

2010-11
Spa
1
women